Acacia filamentosa is a shrub belonging to the genus Acacia and the subgenus Juliflorae that is endemic to north western Australia.

Description
It has glabrous and resinous branchlets. Like most species of Acacia it has phyllodes rather than true leaves. It blooms from June to September producing yellow flowers. The crustaceous to thin-coriaceous seed pods that form after flowering have a linear shape and are slightly raised over and constricted between the seeds. The brown seeds have a yellow coloured peripheral band and are arranged longitudinally within the pods.

Distribution

See also
List of Acacia species

References

filamentosa
Acacias of Western Australia
Taxa named by Bruce Maslin
Plants described in 1983